Gabriel Izard (28 September 1901 – 21 October 1971) was a French bobsledder. He competed in the four-man event at the 1924 Winter Olympics.

References

1901 births
1971 deaths
French male bobsledders
Olympic bobsledders of France
Bobsledders at the 1924 Winter Olympics
Place of birth missing